Martyn Christopher Smith (born 16 September 1961) is an English former footballer who played as a midfielder for Leek Town, Port Vale, Macclesfield Town, and Eastwood Hanley.

Career
Smith played for Alsager College before joining Nantwich Town in September 1980. Moved to North West Counties League side Leek Town in November 1981 before signing for John Rudge's Port Vale in August 1984. He played 13 Fourth Division games and one FA Cup game in the 1984–85 season. His one and only goal in the Football League came on 28 December, in a 3–2 defeat to Colchester United at Layer Road. He was handed a free transfer away from Vale Park in May 1985. He moved on to Macclesfield Town of the Northern Premier League, becoming a first team regular until losing his place when manager Neil Griffiths left in February 1986. He moved on to Eastwood, before moving back to old club Leek Town, later being appointed as Leek's assistant manager.  Also served as Assistant Manager of Newcastle Town and Manager of Rocester.

Career statistics
Source:

References

Footballers from Stoke-on-Trent
English footballers
Association football midfielders
Leek Town F.C. players
Port Vale F.C. players
Macclesfield Town F.C. players
Eastwood Hanley F.C. players
English Football League players
North West Counties Football League players
Northern Premier League players
Southern Football League players
Association football coaches
1961 births
Living people